Pandit Mani Prasad (4 November 1929 - 13 January 2023) was an Indian classical vocalist from the Kirana gharana (singing style).

Early life and training

Mani Prasad was born into a family of musicians. His father, Sukhdev Prasad, had received music training from Abdul Karim Khan and Abdul Wahid Khan, the founders of the Kirana gharana.

Mani Prasad accompanied his father on all his tours and performances across the country from an early age. He moved from Wardha in Maharashtra to New Delhi in his youth along with his father. He was trained mostly by his father but was also guided by his grandfather Pandit Shakti Lal and by his uncles Pandit Shankar Lal and Pandit Gopal Prasad.

Musical career

Pandit Mani Prasad started his career early, being brought up in a musical family. He is ranked as a Top Grade 'A class' artist by the All India Radio and is a well recognised television artist with the Doordarshan.

He has not only created some new ragas but also composed many bandishes in existing ragas with the mudra Dhyan Rang Piya. The new ragas include Dhyan Kalyan, Dhyani Todi, Shivkauns and Bhoopeshwari.

Among his students are Maharaja Ranjitsinh Pratapsinh Gaekwad of Baroda, Savita Devi Maharaj (daughter of thumri singer Siddheshwari Devi), Rita Ganguly, Ramesh Jule, Ravi Jule, Pt. Vishwanath, Uma Garg, Surinder Kaur, and Chandan Dass.

In recent years, served as the Guru at the Dr. Gangubai Hangal Gurukul in Hubli, Karnataka where he was invited by the Government of Karnataka.

Discography
 Pt. Mani Prasad, A Concert Series by Swarashree Enterprises, CBS
 Pt. Mani Prasad, MIDAS
 Pt. Mani Prasad, Swaranjali
 Dhyan Rang Piya, MIDAS
 Love Bandish Bliss, Times Music

Honours and awards

 Sangeet Natak Akademi Award in 2019
 Rajasthan Sangeet Natak Akademi Award
 Swarmani Award
 Raseshwar Award given by Sur Singar Samsad of Mumbai
 Baba Allaudin Khan Award
 Srimati Gangubai Hangal Award
 Ustad Faiyyaz Khan - Ustad Niaz Khan Memorial Award
 Swar Sadhana Ratna
 Sangeet Martand Samman
 Sangeet Kala Ratna
 Felicitation by Raagranjini

Gallery

Personal life
Pandit Mani Prasad passed away on 13 January 2023 in Mumbai. He is survived by his three children - Deepak Prasad, Lata Tandon, and Lalit Prasad, who are also involved in Indian classical music. His grandson, Rahul Babbar is an up and coming singer and takes forward his legacy.

References

Living people
Hindustani singers
20th-century Indian male classical singers
1930 births
Kirana gharana
People from Wardha district
20th-century Khyal singers
Recipients of the Sangeet Natak Akademi Award